Nyctemera simulatrix is a moth of the family Erebidae first described by Francis Walker in 1864. It is found on Sulawesi, Flores, Bangai and the Key Islands.

Subspecies
Nyctemera simulatrix simulatrix (central and south-western Sulawesi, Flores)
Nyctemera simulatrix basinigra Niewenhuis, 1948 (south-eastern Sulawesi, Bangai)
Nyctemera simulatrix consobrina (Hopffer, 1874) (Sulawesi: eastern Minahassa Peninsula)

References

Nyctemerina
Moths described in 1864